Wu Hu may refer to:

 Five Lakes (China)
 Wu Zetian (Empress Wu Hu) of the Tang dynasty
 Five Barbarians
 Five Tiger Generals

See also
 Wuhu (disambiguation)